Cyprus West University (CWU; , commonly referred to as KIBÜ) is a non-profit university located in Famagusta, Northern Cyprus was established in 2015. Cyprus West University has five faculties, three schools, and 20 different undergraduate and associate programs are offered in English and Turkish Languages. Cyprus West University is accredited by YÖK, Turkish Republic Higher Education Board and YÖDAK, The Higher Education Planning, Evaluation, Accreditation and coordination Council of Northern Cyprus, and approved by TRNC Ministry of National Education and Culture.

Campus 

Cyprus West University was founded on 8 December 2015 in Famagusta city center and includes education building, dormitory, sports fields and all kinds of social cultural structures. New campus project is under construction and it is planned to be completed in a short time.

The campus consists of Open and closed cafeterias, Basketball Field, Volleyball Field, Table Tennis Field, Parking Area, Student Dormitory, Conference hall, Computer lab, Library, Prayer Room, Infirmary, Classrooms, and Medical Laboratory.

Faculties and schools 
 Institute of Social Science
Faculty of Economics, Administrative, and Social Sciences
Faculty of Engineering
 Faculty of Health Sciences
 Faculty of Law
 Faculty of Education
 School of Justice
 School of Health
 English Preparatory School

Master programs 
 Master of Business Administration (MBA)

Undergraduate programs 
Electrical and Electronics Engineering
Computer Engineering
Information System Engineering
Software Engineering 
Business Administration
Tourism and Hotel Management
Civil Aviation Management
Psychology
Logistics
Law
International Law
Nutrition and Dietetics
Guidance and Psychological Counseling

Associate programs 
 Justice
Pharmaceutics
 First Aid and Emergency Aid
 Anesthesia
 Operating Room Services

Schools 
 Foundation English School (FES)

References 

Universities in Northern Cyprus